Mount Gya, is a mountain peak located at  above sea level. It is in India near the tri-junction of Tibet (China), Ladakh (India) and Himachal Pradesh (India). ‘Gya’ meant many things including ‘Hundred’, ‘White’, ‘Long pointed Chinese beard’ etc.

References

China–India border
Gya
Gya
Gya
Six-thousanders of the Himalayas